Swedish Arabs are citizens and residents of Sweden who emigrated from nations in the Arab world. They represent 5.3% of the total population of the country. About a quarter of Arabs in Sweden are Christians.

Migration history
Many of the Arabs in Sweden are migrants from Syria, Iraq, Somalia, Lebanon, Morocco, Palestine, Egypt, Tunisia, Algeria and Saudi Arabia.

In September 2013, Swedish migration authorities ruled that all Syrian asylum seekers will be granted permanent residency in light of the worsening conflict in Syria. Sweden is the first EU-country to make this offer. The decision means that the roughly 8,000 Syrians who have temporary residency in Sweden will now be able to stay in the country permanently. They will also have the right to bring their families to Sweden. While Malek Laesker, vice-chair of the Syrian Arabian Cultural Association of Sweden, welcomed the decision, he also warned it could create issues. "The fact that Sweden is the first country to open its arms is both positive and negative," he told the TT news agency, explaining that it may be a boon for the growing people-smuggling market.

Notable people
Film, television and acting
 Malik Bendjelloul, filmmaker of Algerian descent
 Mohamed Said (actor), actor of Iraqi origin
 Tarik Saleh, film director of Egyptian descent
 Said Legue, actor and script writer of Moroccan origin

Musicians
 Salem Al Fakir, Grammy Award-winning singer of Syrian origin
 Rabih Jaber, singer of Lebanese origin, also part of Rebound! with Eddie Razaz
 Josef Johansson, pop singer of Tunisian origin
 Leila K, singer and rapper of Moroccan descent
 Loreen, singer of Moroccan-Berber descent
 Maher Zain, singer and songwriter of Lebanese origin
 RedOne, songwriter and music producer of Moroccan origin
 Rami Yacoub, songwriter and music producer of Palestinian origin

Sports
 Nabil Bahoui, footballer of Moroccan origin
 Nadir Benchenaa, footballer of Algerian origin
 Dalil Benyahia, footballer of Algerian descent
 Louay Chanko, footballer of Syrian origin
 Jimmy Durmaz, footballer of Syrian-Turkish origin
 Seif Kadhim,  footballer of Iraqi origin
 Mohammed Ali Khan, footballer of Lebanese origin
 George Moussan, footballer of Syrian origin
 Christer Youssef, footballer of Syrian origin
 Yussuf Saleh
 Gabriel Ozkan

Others
 Modhir Ahmed, visual artist of Iraqi origin
 Mahmoud Aldebe, of the Muslim association of Jordanian descent
 Nadia Jebril, journalist and television presenter of Palestinian origin
 Osama Krayem, suspected terrorist of Syrian origin
 Fida al-Sayed, political activist of Syrian descent

See also 
Arab diaspora
Arabs in Europe
Islam in Sweden
Moroccans in Sweden
Iraqis in Sweden
Lebanese people in Sweden
Syrians in Sweden
Immigration to Sweden

References

External source 
 Dialogue and openness - Sweden in the UN Security Council

 
Ethnic groups in Sweden
Swedish people of Arab descent
Middle Eastern diaspora in Sweden
Muslim communities in Europe